Gnathoweisea is a genus of lady beetles in the family Coccinellidae. There are about six described species in Gnathoweisea.

Species
These six species belong to the genus Gnathoweisea:
 Gnathoweisea ferox Gordon, 1985
 Gnathoweisea hageni Gordon, 1985
 Gnathoweisea micula Gordon, 1985
 Gnathoweisea planiceps (Casey, 1899)
 Gnathoweisea schwarzi Gordon, 1970
 Gnathoweisea texana Gordon, 1985

References

Further reading

 
 

Coccinellidae
Coccinellidae genera
Articles created by Qbugbot